Gorny was an air base located  southeast of the work settlement of Gorny in Krasnopartizansky District of Saratov Oblast, Russia. It is a military base from the Cold War which has since been plowed under into farmland.

References
RussianAirFields.com

Soviet Air Force bases
Buildings and structures in Saratov Oblast